Odyssey (also known as NT6) was the codename for a version of Microsoft Windows that was intended to succeed Windows 2000. The project was cancelled in early 2000 and later merged with Neptune to create Windows XP.

Development
Development of Odyssey began alongside the consumer-based Neptune in 1999 and was based on the Windows 2000 codebase. Features planned for Odyssey were the new Activity Centers as well as a new user interface. The version number of Odyssey is unknown, with some unverified sources claiming it as NT 6.0 or NT 5.5.

Due to high hardware requirements and because Odyssey and Neptune were based on the same codebase anyway, Microsoft combined them to form codename Whistler, for efficiency. No builds or versions of Odyssey were ever leaked or released by Microsoft as the product never left the planning stage.

Confidential documents from the Comes vs. Microsoft case do state that Odyssey was indeed under development.

See also
List of Microsoft codenames

References

Microsoft Windows